Henry VIII is a two-part British television serial produced principally by Granada Television for ITV from 12 to 19 October 2003. It chronicles the life of Henry VIII of England from the disintegration of his first marriage to an aging Spanish princess until his death following a stroke in 1547, by which time he had married for the sixth time. Additional production funding was provided by WGBH Boston, Powercorp and the Australian Broadcasting Corporation.

It stars Ray Winstone in his first role in a costume drama. His co-star is Helena Bonham Carter who played Henry VIII's second wife, Anne Boleyn; her character dominates the first episode and her dramatic death brings the first part of the story to its conclusion. David Suchet also makes an appearance as Henry's first chief minister, Cardinal Wolsey. The second episode, which follows the last eleven years of Henry's life, sees Winstone act opposite Emilia Fox, as his docile third wife Jane Seymour, Sean Bean as Robert Aske, leader of the Pilgrimage of Grace, and Emily Blunt (in her first major appearance) as Catherine Howard, the promiscuous teenager who was coerced into becoming Henry's fifth queen.

Plot

Episode 1 
The first episode opens to reveal a dying Henry VII mistaking his heir Henry VIII for his late son Arthur Tudor. Concerned for the fragile chances of his family's dynasty, the dying king implores his son to marry his brother's widow Catherine of Aragon and have a son to secure the family line. Fifteen years later Henry VIII is the most popular King to ever sit on the throne, but he still does not have a son by his Queen, only a daughter Mary. Elsewhere at Hever Castle in Kent the Boleyn Family celebrate the engagement of their daughter Anne to Henry Percy the future Earl of Northumberland. The head of the family the Duke of Norfolk assures her father, Thomas Boleyn, that he has the king's ear on the match and that he will give them permission to marry. But once the roving eye of the king falls upon Anne, he quickly finds a reason for the marriage to be cancelled and wastes no time in persuading her for himself, even riding from his secluded coastal castle to Kent during an outbreak of illness. Resolved that Anne will not become his mistress, but his wife, the King instructs his chancellor Cardinal Wolsey to find a way for his marriage to his devoted wife to be annulled, prompting two opportunistic Protestants reformers, Thomas Cromwell and Thomas Cranmer, to provide a way for the king to marry Anne Boleyn and bring untold wealth to his pocket but only if he breaks with the Catholic Church. Finally, his wife Anne is soon pregnant, only for Henry's hopes to be dashed.  Instead of the longed for son and heir, Anne delivers a daughter, Elizabeth, and Henry's ardor cools towards her, even more so when he meets the sister of two of his courtiers, Jane Seymour. Despite the growing tensions between the King and Queen, Anne becomes pregnant once more but goes into premature labor and delivers a stillborn son. The first episode ends with an angry King Henry demanding Cromwell get rid of Anne which results in her subsequent trial and execution.

Episode 2 
The second episode begins with Jane Seymour being dressed for her wedding and her subsequent introduction to the people who take her to their hearts, whilst the King and Cromwell differ on the dissolution of the monasteries which have angered the English Catholics and united them into a huge army to march on London in protest calling it, the Pilgrimage of Grace, headed by the King's former comrade Robert Aske whom the King tricks into incriminating himself into treason and is sentenced to a gruesome traitor's death. The country is on edge as the Queen goes into labour and finally gives birth to a son much to Henry's joy although it is cut short when the Queen dies. Two years after the Queen's death, Cromwell, whose power has steadily risen through the days of Anne Boleyn encourages the King to consider marrying the Protestant Anne of Cleves but once he sets sights on her, the King is repulsed and immediately seeks a way out of the marriage. Seeing the decline of Protestant influence, the Duke of Norfolk devises a way to snatch the reins of power and arranges for his teenage niece Catherine Howard to enchant the increasingly obese and terrifying King and to eventually marry him.

It soon transpires that the young Queen has a promiscuous history and is having an affair with a man in the king's service which the Protestant reformers seize as their opportunity to rid themselves of the Catholic faction. The Queen and her family are arrested and the young Queen dies at the hands of the executioner, like her cousin Anne Boleyn. With the demise of Catholic peers the reformers take the opportunity to consolidate their power, enhanced by the wedding of the king to Catherine Parr who attempts to unite the royal family. The film closes as the King reflects on his past loves. His obsession with Anne Boleyn, his quiet but steady affection for Jane Seymour and his lust for the young Catherine Howard. Finally the king's over indulgent life catches up with him and he suffers a seizure and later dies in a scene reminiscent of the film's opening, imploring his son to be successful as a man before he can be successful as a king. He dies with his son and last wife beside him.

The closing scene of the film provides a summary of the lives of the remaining characters,

Cast 

 Ray Winstone as King Henry VIII
 Joss Ackland as King Henry VII
 Sid Mitchell as the young Henry VIII
 Charles Dance as the Duke of Buckingham
 Mark Strong as the Duke of Norfolk
 Assumpta Serna as Katherine of Aragon
 Thomas Lockyer as Edward Seymour
 William Houston as Thomas Seymour
 David Suchet as Thomas Wolsey
 Danny Webb as Thomas Cromwell
 Scott Handy as Henry Percy
 Helena Bonham Carter as Anne Boleyn
 Dominic Mafham as George Boleyn
 Benjamin Whitrow as Thomas Boleyn
 John Higgins as Robert Barnes
 Michael Maloney as Thomas Cranmer
 Lara Belmont as Mary Tudor
 Emilia Fox as Jane Seymour
 Sean Bean as Robert Aske
 Joseph Morgan as Thomas Culpeper
 Marsha Fitzalan as the Duchess of Norfolk
 Terence Harvey as Bishop Gardiner
 Kelly Hunter as Lady Rochford
 Pia Girard as Anne of Cleves
 Emily Blunt as Catherine Howard
 Tom Turner as Francis Dereham
 Clare Holman as Catherine Parr
 Hugh Mitchell as Edward VI of England
 David Gwillim as Physician
 Derek Jacobi as the Narrator

Production 
The serial was announced in 2001, with Alan Bleasdale as the writer. Granada Television's controller of drama Andy Harries could secure only £750,000 for each hour of Henry VIII from ITV, so had to attract co-production funding from other companies. He approached the American CBS network for the money. CBS executives wanted to replace Helena Bonham Carter with Sarah Michelle Gellar and dub all of the actors' voices with American accents. Harries declined CBS's funding and got the money from Powercorp, WGBH Boston and the Australian Broadcasting Corporation instead. The final budget was £5.2 million. Bleasdale had originally scripted an opening scene that featured Henry confronting the devil in hell. ITV's director of drama commissioning Nick Elliott told Harries, "I'm not having the devil on ITV. You'd better ring him and tell him I'm not paying £5 million to have the devil on ITV." Bleasdale then quit the project. He was replaced by Peter Morgan, who had written the Granada drama The Jury.

Filming took place at Pinewood Studios with exteriors filmed at Leeds Castle in Kent. Post-production took six months.

Accolades

References

External links

2003 British television series debuts
2003 British television series endings
2000s British drama television series
Cultural depictions of Henry VIII
Cultural depictions of Edward VI of England
Cultural depictions of Anne Boleyn
Cultural depictions of Catherine of Aragon
ITV television dramas
2000s British television miniseries
Television series by ITV Studios
Television shows produced by Granada Television
Television series set in the 16th century
Television set in Tudor England
Television shows written by Peter Morgan
English-language television shows
Television series produced at Pinewood Studios
International Emmy Award for Best TV Movie or Miniseries